Toanui Isamaela is a Cook Islands politician and member of the Cook Islands Parliament. He is a member of the One Cook Islands Movement.

Isamaela was first elected to Parliament at the 2010 Cook Islands general election. He was re-elected at the 2014 election. He was not re-elected in 2018, losing the seat to Democrat Terepai Maoate Jnr.

He contested the 2022 Cook Islands general election as a One Cook Islands Movement candidate, and was re-elected.

References

Living people
Year of birth missing (living people)
Members of the Parliament of the Cook Islands
Cook Islands Party politicians
One Cook Islands Movement politicians